Remmels is a municipality in the district of Rendsburg-Eckernförde, in Schleswig-Holstein, Germany of about 3.66 square miles with a population of 430 as of 12/31/2013.

See also
 Remmel

References

Municipalities in Schleswig-Holstein
Rendsburg-Eckernförde